The Kakanaut Formation is a geological formation in Siberia, whose strata date back to the Late Cretaceous (Maastrichtian). Dinosaur remains are among the fossils that have been recovered from the formation. The flora of the formation is relictual, containing some of the youngest remains of the extinct plant orders Bennettitales and Czekanowskiales.

Fossil content 

 Troodon cf. formosus
 Ankylosauria indet.
 Dinosauria indet.
 Dromaeosauridae indet.
 Hadrosauridae indet.
 Neoceratopsia indet.
 Ornithopoda indet.
 Prismatoolithidae indet.
 Spheroolithidae indet.
 Theropoda indet.
 Tyrannosauridae indet.
 ?Aves indet.

See also 
 List of dinosaur-bearing rock formations
 List of fossiliferous stratigraphic units in Russia

References

Bibliography 
 
 

Geologic formations of Russia
Upper Cretaceous Series of Asia
Cretaceous Russia
Maastrichtian Stage
Sandstone formations
Lacustrine deposits
Paleontology in Russia
Geology of Siberia